The men's 70 kg competition in judo at the 1976 Summer Olympics in Montreal was held on 29 July at the Olympic Velodrome.

Two single-elimination pools, with winner of each pool advanced to the final. All judoka losing to the winner of each pool advanced to repêchage pools, with the winners of the repêchage pools earning bronze medals.

Results

Finals

Repechages

Pool A

Pool B

References

External links
 http://www.judoinside.com/event/7/1976_Olympic_Games_Montreal/judo-matches?cId=70
 http://library.la84.org/6oic/OfficialReports/1976/1976v3.pdf

Judo at the 1976 Summer Olympics
Judo at the Summer Olympics Men's Half Middleweight